Acrocercops ipomoeae is a moth of the family Gracillariidae. It is known from Cuba.

The larvae feed on Jacquemontia and Ipomoea species, including Ipomoea batatas. They probably mine the leaves of their host plant.

References

ipomoeae
Moths of the Caribbean
Moths described in 1934
Endemic fauna of Cuba